Central Mall is a shopping mall located in Texarkana, Texas, U.S. Opened in 1978, the anchor stores are Dillard's and JCPenney. There is one vacant anchor formerly occupied by Sears.

History
Dillard's opened at the mall on August 9, 1978. The mall was built by Texarkana developers Warmack and Company, who sold it in 2004.

Dillard's expanded its store in 2016. On June 6, 2017, it was announced that Sears, an original tenant, would be closing as part of a plan to close 72 stores nationwide. The store closed in September 2017. On September 26, 2018, the mall was put up for auction. On December 5, 2019, it was announced that Bealls, also an original tenant, would be renamed Gordmans in 2020. However on March 19, 2020, it was announced that Bealls would close. This left Dillard's and JCPenney as the only anchors.

References

External links

Shopping malls in Texas
Texarkana, Texas
Shopping malls established in 1978
1978 establishments in Texas
Buildings and structures in Bowie County, Texas
Kohan Retail Investment Group